Bringhurst is an unincorporated community in Monroe Township, Carroll County, Indiana, United States. It is part of the Lafayette, Indiana Metropolitan Statistical Area.

History
The Bringhurst post office was established in 1872. Bringhurst was named for Colonel Bringhurst.

Geography
Bringhurst is located less than a mile south of the larger community of Flora along the Winamac Southern Railway. Indiana State Road 75 runs north and south along the town's west side.

Demographics

Education
Bringhurst residents may obtain a library card at the Burlington Community Library in Burlington.

References

External links

Unincorporated communities in Carroll County, Indiana
Unincorporated communities in Indiana
Lafayette metropolitan area, Indiana